Geronimo Perez Treñas (born December 4, 1956), publicly known as Jerry Treñas, is a Filipino politician who is currently serving as the Mayor of Iloilo City since 2019. Treñas also holds the position of chairman of the Metro Iloilo–Guimaras Economic Development Council (MIGEDC), the government agency responsible for the development of the Metro Iloilo–Guimaras area.

Early life 
Treñas was born to Efrain Blancaflor Treñas, a World War II veteran and former Constitutional Commissioner, and Soledad Perez-Treñas, a housewife. His grandfather, Potenciano Treñas, was a former Senator of the Republic. In 1978, he graduated from Ateneo de Manila University with a Bachelor of Arts in Political Science. Afterwards, he pursued law and graduated with honors from the Ateneo de Manila University School of Law in 1982. He placed 11th in the 1982 Bar Examinations, with an average score of 88.325%.

Political career 
Treñas entered politics in 1986 after he became a City Councilor. He was reelected as a City Councilor from 1988 until 1992, when he became the mayor of Iloilo City by succession for only two months. In 2001, he was elected as the mayor of Iloilo City for three terms (2001-2010). He is the only person elected to the position of mayor of Iloilo City who won by a landslide in all precincts in the city (2004 and 2007 elections).

From 2010 until 2019, he was the congressman of the lone district of Iloilo City. He is currently serving as the mayor of Iloilo City after winning against his brother-in-law, Jose Espinosa III, in the 2019 election.

Personal life 
Treñas is married to Rosalie Sarabia, who is actively involved in numerous public service projects in Iloilo City. They have five children: Raisa Maria Lourdes, Jose Carlo Tomas, Jose Maria Miguel, Geronimo Efrain Salvador, and Jose Juan Paolo.

References

External links
 Office
 
 

|-

|-

|-

|-

1956 births
Living people
People from Iloilo City
Hiligaynon people
Visayan people
Filipino Roman Catholics
Mayors of Iloilo City
Members of the House of Representatives of the Philippines from Iloilo City
National Unity Party (Philippines) politicians
Ateneo de Manila University alumni